Avalsjøen is a lake in the municipality of Lunner in Viken county, Norway.

See also
List of lakes in Norway

References
NVE Atlas - Norwegian Water Resources and Energy Directorate - Innsjødatabase - accessed 2020-12-19

Lakes of Viken (county)